Hypericum maculatum, commonly known as  imperforate St John's-wort, or spotted St. Johnswort,  is a species of perennial herbaceous flowering plant in the family Hypericaceae. It is native to Europe and Western Asia where it grows in moist meadows.

Description
Hypericum maculatum is a hairless perennial herbaceous plant growing to about 60 cm. The stem is square in cross section, but without the wings shown in H. tetrapterum. There may be black dots on the leaves, petals and sepals. The flowers are yellow, up to about 25mm across. The species hybridises with Hypericum perforatum to produce Des Etang's St John's wort, Hypericum x desetangsii.

Uses
It is considered to be a medicinal plant. Hypericum maculatum herb has been used in the traditional Austrian medicine internally as tea or oil extract, and externally as oil extract, ointment or cold maceration in ethanol for treatment of disorders of the skin, locomotor system, nervous system, gastrointestinal tract, respiratory tract, kidneys and urinary tract, cardiovascular system, infections, rheumatism and gout.

References

maculatum
Flora of Europe
Flora of Western Asia